Vernon Criss (born September 25, 1954) is an American politician who has served in the West Virginia House of Delegates from the 10th district since 2016. He previously served in the West Virginia House of Delegates from the 8th district from 1987 to 1990.

References

1954 births
Living people
Republican Party members of the West Virginia House of Delegates
21st-century American politicians